is a Japanese sledge hockey player. He was part of the Japanese sledge hockey team that won a silver medal at the 2010 Winter Paralympics.

He has a functional disability of his trunk.

References

External links 
 
 

1976 births
Living people
Japanese sledge hockey players
Paralympic sledge hockey players of Japan
Paralympic silver medalists for Japan
Ice sledge hockey players at the 2002 Winter Paralympics
Ice sledge hockey players at the 1998 Winter Paralympics
Ice sledge hockey players at the 2010 Winter Paralympics
Medalists at the 2010 Winter Paralympics
People from Matsumoto, Nagano
Sportspeople from Nagano Prefecture
Japanese amputees
Paralympic medalists in sledge hockey